Poonthottam is a 1998 Indian Tamil-language action drama film directed by Kalanjiyam. The film stars Murali and Devayani, while Raghuvaran, Manivannan and Vijayalakshmi play other supporting roles. The film, which has music by Ilaiyaraaja, released in July 1998.

Cast

Murali as Moorthy
Devayani as Sundari 
Raghuvaran as Panneerselvam "Panneer"
Manivannan as Mani
Vadivelu as Auto driver
M. N. Nambiar as Sundari's grandfather
Manorama as Sundari's grandmother
Vijayalakshmi as Sumathi
Thalaivasal Vijay
Vennira Aadai Moorthy
Vijay Adhiraj as Suresh
Santhana Bharathi as Suresh's father
Vichithra as Guest appearance 
Crane Manohar as Guest appearance
Nassar as Guest appearance
Ambika as Guest appearance
Vadivukkarasi as Guest appearance

Soundtrack

Production
Director Kalanjiyam chose to re-collaborate with Murali and Devayani, who he had worked with in his first film Poomani (1996).

Release
The film won positive reviews upon release, with a critic from Indolink.com noting it was "a soft and sentimental movie largely playing with human emotions, but ineffectively supported by screenplay and direction."

References

1998 films
Films scored by Ilaiyaraaja
1990s Tamil-language films
Indian drama films
Films directed by Kalanjiyam